Cosmic Trigger III: My Life After Death  is the third book in the Cosmic Trigger series, a three-volume autobiographical and philosophical work by Robert Anton Wilson.

Cosmic Trigger III, published in 1995, delivers observations about the widespread (and premature) announcement of his demise, along with synchronicities, religious fanatics, UFOs, crop circles, paranoia, pompous scientists, secret societies, high tech, black magic, quantum physics, hoaxes (real and fake), Orson Welles, James Joyce, Carl Sagan, Madonna, and the vagina of Nuit.

The third volume in Wilson’s Cosmic Trigger series begins with an analysis of a faked internet news story announcing the author’s death, in February 1994. Wilson discusses this with his usual humor, and then uses it as a springboard into philosophical meditation on broader issues relating to the nature of ‘truth’ and existential questions about death and reality. Indeed, much of the book is concerned with the mutability of reality; the different layers or ‘masks’ of experience, in a Nietzschean sense. Wilson uses the example of Elmyr, the art forger, to explore issues such as authenticity and consensus reality. Another key figure throughout is Orson Welles. Wilson comments on the techniques Welles used in his films, relating their effects to the relativistic conceptualization of reality that Wilson associates with the use of marijuana.

He also carries on his examination of information density and its move ‘steadily westward’ which he touched upon in the second volume of the series. In this regard, and elsewhere in the book, Wilson embraces the ideas and philosophy of R. Buckminster Fuller.

Other concepts explored are postmodernism and political correctness; and he use the example of militant feminism to demonstrate how dogmatic adherence to any belief system can result in intolerant and even dangerous ideologies, suggesting that dogmatic and extreme feminism has made androphobia acceptable (he uses the term 'androphobia' in reference to the fear/hatred of all men on ideological grounds, rather than in the psychological sense). Although this argument could be construed by some as sexist, it is made clear that he is in agreement with the basic aims of traditional and mainstream feminism (i.e. the equality of women and men) and he only opposes the most extreme strains of feminism, and he also states that he is in agreement with many of the goals of political correctness, yet opposes the ‘fascist’ tactics used by some of its adherents to force its ideals on people.

Other topics include LSD, science fiction writer Philip K. Dick, and the potential pitfalls of blindly accepting ‘expert’ opinion; all loosely connected by the underlying theme of the perspectival and relative construction of reality.

The trilogy
Cosmic Trigger I: The Final Secret of the Illuminati
Cosmic Trigger II: Down to Earth
Cosmic Trigger III: My Life After Death

External links
Excerpt from Cosmic Trigger III

1995 books
Books by Robert Anton Wilson
Discordianism
Books about feminism
Works about postmodernism